Water polo was contested for men only at the 1998 Central American and Caribbean Games in Maracaibo, Venezuela.

References
 

1998 Central American and Caribbean Games
1998
1998 in water polo